GoPets: Vacation Island is a 2008 virtual pet video game for the Nintendo DS. It was developed by 1st Playable Productions and Engine Software and published by Konami. It was based on the 2004 web version of the game, GoPets. It was criticized for having less variety than the web version, however, because it was cloud based, one would have the ability to allow their pets to 'roam', and allow other pets to roam to their island, which added some. Communication is done entirely through 'Iku', which was described as "haiku with pictures". The game also contained various minigames.

References

External links
Official Site

2008 video games
Engine Software games
Konami games
Nintendo DS games
Nintendo DS-only games
Single-player video games
Video games developed in the Netherlands
Video games developed in the United States
Video games set on fictional islands
Virtual pet video games
Works about vacationing
1st Playable Productions games